The 2008–09 Oklahoma Sooners men's basketball team represented the University of Oklahoma in the 2008–09 NCAA Division I men's basketball season. The head coach is Jeff Capel, who was in his third year with the team. The team played its home games in the Lloyd Noble Center in Norman, OK.

Roster

Recruiting

Schedule 

|-
!colspan=12 style=|Regular season

|-
!colspan=12 style=|Big 12 Tournament 

|-
!colspan=12 style=|NCAA Tournament

Rankings

References 

Oklahoma Sooners men's basketball seasons
Oklahoma
Oklahoma